Summer Nights is a French drama film, directed by Mario Fanfani and released in 2014. The film stars Guillaume de Tonquédec as Michel, a married man who has a secret life as a cross-dresser who goes by the drag name Mylène.

The film premiered at the 2014 Venice Film Festival, where it won the Queer Lion award as the best LGBTQ-themed film of the festival.

References

External links

2014 films
2014 drama films
French drama films
French LGBT-related films
LGBT-related drama films
2014 LGBT-related films
2010s French films